Operation Round Robin was an operation of the United States Air Force that was designed to evaluate aircraft cross-servicing procedures and combined air tactics.

See also
Operation Head Start
Operation Chrome Dome
Thule Monitor Mission
Operation Giant Lance

References

Military operations of the Cold War